Jesús Miguel Rollán Prada (4 April 1968 – 11 March 2006) was a water polo goalkeeper from Spain who was a member of the national team that won the gold medal at the 1996 Summer Olympics in Atlanta, Georgia.

Four years earlier, when Barcelona hosted the Summer Olympics, he was on the squad that captured the silver medal. Born in Madrid, Rollán competed in five Summer Olympics, starting in 1988. He is among four Spanish water polo players, all in the 1992 and 1996 medal winning teams, to have competed at five Olympics, the others being Manuel Estiarte, Chiqui Sans and Chava Gomez. Rollán is the first water polo goalkeeper of either gender to compete at five Olympics.

He was also known as a close friend of Infanta Cristina, whom he introduced to her future husband Iñaki Urdangarin.

On 11 March 2006, three weeks and three days before his 38th birthday, Rollán died after a fall from a terrace at a spa near Barcelona. He was at the spa receiving treatment for depression. The fees for the spa were being paid for by the Spanish Olympic Committee.

See also
 Spain men's Olympic water polo team records and statistics
 List of athletes with the most appearances at Olympic Games
 List of players who have appeared in multiple men's Olympic water polo tournaments
 List of Olympic champions in men's water polo
 List of Olympic medalists in water polo (men)
 List of men's Olympic water polo tournament goalkeepers
 List of world champions in men's water polo
 List of World Aquatics Championships medalists in water polo
 List of members of the International Swimming Hall of Fame

References

External links
 

1968 births
2006 suicides
Sportspeople from Madrid
Spanish male water polo players
Water polo goalkeepers
Water polo players at the 1988 Summer Olympics
Water polo players at the 1992 Summer Olympics
Water polo players at the 1996 Summer Olympics
Water polo players at the 2000 Summer Olympics
Water polo players at the 2004 Summer Olympics
Medalists at the 1992 Summer Olympics
Medalists at the 1996 Summer Olympics
Olympic gold medalists for Spain in water polo
Olympic silver medalists for Spain in water polo
World Aquatics Championships medalists in water polo
Suicides by jumping in Spain
Water polo players from the Community of Madrid
Spanish expatriate sportspeople in Italy
Expatriate water polo players